Minami (みなみ; ミナミ; 南, lit. "south") is both a Japanese surname and a feminine Japanese given name.

Possible Writings
Minami (南) is shared by 100,000+ individuals in Japan. The remaining variants are used by less than 2,000 individuals each and are generally used by related families.

As a given name, Minami may be written as simply "みなみ" and rarely "ミナミ", or it can be written using different kanji characters or a mix of hiragana and kanji to convey different meanings, such as:

People with the surname
Akina Minami (南 明奈, born 1989), Japanese gravure idol and tarento
Dale Minami (born 1946), Japanese American lawyer
Eiko Minami (南 栄子, born 1909), Japanese dancer
Haruka Minami (みなみ 遥), Japanese manga artist
Haruo Minami (三波 春夫, 1923–2001), Japanese enka singer
Hikari Minami (みなみ 飛香, born 1994), Japanese professional wrestler
Hiroaki Minami (南 弘明, born 1934), Japanese composer 
Jirō Minami (南 次郎, 1874–1955), Japanese general and convicted World War II war criminal
Kaho Minami (南 果歩, born 1964), Japanese actress
Katsuyuki Minami (南 克幸, born 1970), Japanese volleyball player
Kunzo Minami (南 薫造, 1883–1950), Japanese painter
Moeka Minami (南 萌華, born 1998), Japanese women's footballer
Omi Minami (南 央美, born 1968), Japanese voice actress, essayist and columnist
Warren N. Minami (1938-2022), Japanese American, retired senior executive of the IMF, former chair of National Japanese American Memorial Foundation
Yoshiharu Minami (南 喜陽, born 1951), Japanese judoka
Yoshikazu Minami (南 芳一, born 1963), Japanese professional shogi player
Yoshitaka Minami (南 佳孝, born 1950), Japanese musician
Yuta Minami (南 雄太, born 1979), Japanese footballer

People with the given name
Minami (actress) (美波, born 1986), Japanese actress
Minami (singer) (美波, born 1997), Japanese singer
, Japanese table tennis player
Minami Aoyama (青山 南, born 1985), Japanese pink film actress and AV idol
Minami Hamabe (浜辺 美波, born 2000), Japanese actress
Minami Hokuto (北都 南), Japanese voice actress
Minami Iju (伊集 南, born 1990), Japanese women's basketball player
Minami Itahashi (板橋 美波, born 2000), Japanese diver
Minami Kato (加藤 美南, born 1999), Japanese idol, singer and former member of NGT48
Minami Kuribayashi (栗林 みな実, born 1976), Japanese singer-songwriter and voice actress
Minami Minegishi (峯岸 みなみ, born 1992), Japanese idol and member of AKB48 and no3b
Minami Otomo (大友 みなみ, born 1981), Japanese actress and model
Minami Ozaki (尾崎 南, born 1968), Japanese manga artist, also known as Ryo Minami (南亮) and Minami Himemuro (姫室ミナミ)
Minami Sadamasu (貞升 南, born 1986), Japanese professional shogi player
Minami Takahashi (高橋 みなみ, born 1991), Japanese singer, tarento, and former member of AKB48
Minami Takayama (高山 みなみ, born 1964), Japanese voice actress, narrator, singer and composer
Minami Tanaka (田中 美海, born 1996), Japanese voice actress
Minami Tanaka (announcer) (田中 みな実, born 1986), announcer and tarento
Minami Yamanouchi (山ノ内 みなみ, born 1992), Japanese long-distance runner

Fictional characters 
As a given name
Minami Amada (天田 南), a character in the manga Jormungand
Minami Asakura (浅倉 南), a character in the manga Touch
Minami Hayama (葉山 南), a character in the Japanese television drama Long Vacation
Minami Iwasaki (岩崎 みなみ), a character in the Japanese multimedia franchise Lucky Star
Minami Kaido (海藤 みなみ), a character in the anime series Go! Princess PreCure
Minami Katayama (片山 実波), a character in the manga and anime series Wake Up, Girls!
Minami Maki (真木 南), a character in the manga Majitora!
Minami Nanba (難波 南), a character in the manga Hana-Kimi
Minami Shimada (島田 美波), a character in the light novel series Baka and Test
Minami Takahashi (高橋 みなみ), a character in the anime series AKB0048

As a surname
The Minami (南) sisters (Haruka (春香), Kana (夏奈), and Chiaki (千秋)), characters in the manga series Minami-ke
Itsuki Minami (南 樹), a character in the anime and manga series Air Gear
Kaori Minami (南 佳織), a character in the Japanese multimedia franchise Battle Royale
Ken Minami (美波 ケン), a character in the manga Machine Robo Rescue
Kenjirō Minami (南 健次郎), a character in the anime and manga series Yuri on Ice
Kohtaro Minami (南 光太郎), a character in the Japanese superhero drama series Kamen Rider Black and Kamen Rider Black RX
Kotori Minami (南 ことり), a character in the Japanese multimedia franchise Love Live! School Idol Project
Mirei Minami (南 みれぃ), a character in the Japanese multimedia franchise Pripara
Rena Minami (水波 レナ), a character in the anime series Puella Magi Madoka Magica
Shizuku Minami (南 しずく), a character in the manga Sakura Trick
Youichi Minami (南 陽一), a character in the manga Gokusen
Yuko Minami (南 夕子), a character in the Japanese superhero drama series Ultraman Ace

References

Given names
Surnames
Japanese-language surnames
Japanese feminine given names